Ratu Sir George Kadavulevu Cakobau  (6 November 1912 – 25 November 1989) was Governor-General of Fiji from 1973 to 1983. A great-grandson of Ratu Seru Epenisa Cakobau, the King of Bau who had unified all the tribes of Fiji under his reign in the mid-1800s and subsequently ceded the islands to the United Kingdom in 1874, Ratu Sir George held the traditional titles of Vunivalu of Bau and Tui Levuka and thus was considered by many as Fiji's highest-ranking traditional chief. Ratu Cakobau was appointed Governor-General in 1973, becoming the first indigenous Fijian to serve as the representative of Elizabeth II, Queen of Fiji.

Education and early career 

Cakobau was educated first at Fiji's Queen Victoria School, then at Newington College in Australia (1927–1932) and Wanganui Technical College in Wanganui, New Zealand. He became a member of the Great Council of Chiefs in 1938, where he remained until 1972. When he first joined the Council, it had the power to make laws for the ethnic Fijian population, but this power was removed towards the end of the colonial era, as modern political institutions were built.

Cakobau served with the Royal Fiji Military Forces in World War II (1939–1945), rising to the rank of captain. Following his return to Fiji after the end of the war, he was nominated to the Legislative Council in 1951 to replace the deceased George Toganivalu. He remained a member of this body, which was renamed the House of Representatives when Fiji became independent in 1970 until his appointment as Governor-General. He served in the Cabinet, first as Minister for Fijian Affairs and Local Government and subsequently as a minister without portfolio, from 1970 to 1972.

Governor-General of Fiji 

One significant event marked Cakobau's tenure as Governor-General. In March 1977, a constitutional crisis developed following a general election that gave a narrow majority to the Indo-Fijian dominated National Federation Party (NFP). Three days after the election, the NFP splintered in a leadership brawl, and Cakobau, acting as Fiji's effective head of state, then called on the defeated Prime Minister, Ratu Sir Kamisese Mara, to form a new government, pending fresh elections (which were held in September, and resulted in a landslide win for Mara's Alliance Party).

In a public statement, Cakobau defended his actions thus: "In the recent general election, the people of Fiji did not give a clear mandate to either of the major political parties. It, therefore, became the duty of the Governor-General under the Constitution to appoint as Prime Minister the Member of the House of Representatives who appeared to him best able to command the support of the majority of the Members of the House. The Governor-General has not been able to act sooner as it was not until this afternoon that he was informed who had been elected leader of the National Federation Party. The Governor-General, after taking all relevant circumstances into account, has come to the firm conclusion that the person best able to command support of the majority of the Members is the Leader of the Alliance Party, Ratu Sir Kamisese Mara. In compliance with the Constitution and acting in his own deliberate judgment the Governor-General has accordingly appointed Ratu Sir Kamisese as Prime Minister."

Although Cakobau's actions were unquestionably constitutional, they were controversial. Despite the disarray in the NFP, many people, especially in the Indo-Fijian community, were outraged at his role in usurping a popular election, in what many Indo-Fijians saw as a blatant move to protect the privileged position of his fellow Fijian chiefs, who dominated the Mara government.

Honours 

Cakobau was decorated with many honours during his lifetime. Among these was Royal Victorian Chain, a rare and prestigious honour awarded as a sign of the special relationship between Fiji and the Monarchy, following the visit of Queen Elizabeth II in 1982. He was a Freemason.

Sport 

Cakobau played four first-class cricket matches for Fiji during their 1947/48 tour to New Zealand. Cakobau made his debut first-class debut against Auckland and played his fourth and final first-class match on tour against Otago.

In his four first-class matches Cakobau scored 176 runs at a batting average of 25.14, with a single half-century score of 67* coming against Wellington. With the ball, he took 5 wickets at a bowling average of 52.00, with best figures of 2/48. Additionally, he took 3 catches in the field.

During the tour to New Zealand, Cakobau also played 9 non-first-class matches for Fiji, with his final match coming against Hawke's Bay.

He also played a rugby union Test match for Fiji in 1939, against a New Zealand Maori team at Hamilton. Fiji won by 10 points, with Cakobau contributing two points, through a conversion.

Personal life and legacy 

Cakobau was married twice, first to Adi Veniana Gavoka then to Lady Lelea Seruwaia Balekiwai. Several of his children have distinguished themselves in public service. Samanunu Talakuli has held Cabinet office and has been her country's High Commissioner to Malaysia, before being appointed to the Senate in June 2006. George Cakobau, Jr. and Litia Cakobau also served in the Senators from 2001 to 2006. His youngest son, Tanoa Cakobau, was President of the Conservative Alliance, the junior partner in the ruling coalition from 2001 to 2006.

Cakobau retired from office in 1983, but as Fiji's traditional Paramount Chief, he remained influential until his death in 1989.

References

Bibliography

 20th Century Fiji, edited by Stewart Firth & Daryl Tarte – 2001 – , Details on Ratu George Cakobau and his life.

External links
 Ratu George Cakobau a Freemason
George Cakobau at Cricinfo
George Cakobau at CricketArchive
Scrum: George Cakobau

Fijian chiefs
Fijian knights
Fijian Freemasons
Fijian monarchists
Governors-General of Fiji
Vunivalu of Bau
1912 births
1989 deaths
Tui Kaba
Government ministers of Fiji
Politicians from Bau (island)
I-Taukei Fijian members of the Legislative Council of Fiji
I-Taukei Fijian members of the House of Representatives (Fiji)
Knights Grand Cross of the Order of St Michael and St George
Knights Grand Cross of the Royal Victorian Order
Officers of the Order of the British Empire
People educated at Queen Victoria School (Fiji)
People educated at Newington College
Fijian cricketers
Fiji international rugby union players
20th-century Oceanian people
Fijian military personnel of World War II